Lúčky may refer to:

Lúčky, Michalovce District, a village in eastern Slovakia
Lúčky, Ružomberok District, a village in northern Slovakia
Lúčky, Žiar nad Hronom District, a village in central Slovakia

See also
 Lucky (disambiguation)